"The Rise and Fall of Flingel Bunt" is an instrumental by British group the Shadows. It peaked at number 5 in the UK Singles Chart.

Release and reception
"The Rise and Fall of Flingel Bunt" was written by all members of the Shadows. Flingel Bunt is an imaginary character invented by the actor Richard O'Sullivan, a friend of the Shadows. The full title was given to the tune after the group had been to see the film The Rise and Fall of Legs Diamond. It was released with the B-side "It's a Man's World", written by Malcolm Addey and Norman Smith.

Reviewed in Record Mirror, it was described as being "completely different from all the Shads' previous ones". "Good beat and it has plenty of blues' feeling, plus an air of earthiness". For Disc, Don Nicholl wrote that "the actual instrumental itself is a steady, fairly dramatic production with thudding drumwork persisting behind the guitars".

Track listing
7": Columbia / DB 7261
 "The Rise and Fall of Flingel Bunt" – 2:46
 "It's a Man's World" – 2:03

Personnel
 Hank Marvin – electric lead guitar
 Bruce Welch – acoustic rhythm guitar
 John Rostill – electric bass guitar
 Brian Bennett – drums
 Norrie Paramor – piano

Charts

Covers
 The song was covered by Hank Marvin in the 1996 collection Twang!: A Tribute to Hank Marvin & the Shadows.
 It was covered by American bluesman Albert Castiglia on his 2006 album, A Stone's Throw.

References

Songs about fictional male characters
1964 singles
Songs written by John Rostill
The Shadows songs
Songs written by Bruce Welch
Rock instrumentals
1960s instrumentals
Songs written by Hank Marvin
1964 songs
Columbia Graphophone Company singles
Songs written by Brian Bennett